Shelikhov Gulf is a large gulf off the northwestern coast of Kamchatka, Russia. The gulf is named after Russian explorer Grigory Shelikhov.

It is located in the northeastern corner of the Sea of Okhotsk and it branches into two main arms, Gizhigin Bay to the west and Penzhina Bay to the east. Its southwest corner is formed by the P'yagin Peninsula, Yam Bay and the Yamsky Islands.

The Shelikhov Gulf should not be confused with much smaller Shelikhov Bay (Bukhta Shelikhova, 50.3764N, 155.62E), which is also in the Sea of Okhotsk on the northwestern coast of Paramushir Island.

History

Shelikhov Gulf was frequented by American whaleships hunting bowhead and gray whales between 1849 and 1900. They called it Northeast Gulf. They also traded with the natives for fish and reindeer. On 11 August 1867, the barque Stella (270 tons), of New Bedford, Capt. Ebenezer F. Nye, was wrecked on Krayny in the northeastern arm of the gulf. Two men were killed as the barque was smashed to pieces on the rocks. The rest of the crew were split among several vessels.

Wildlife

In the spring and summer beluga whales aggregate in the bays and estuaries at the head of Shelikhov Gulf to feed on spawning herring, smelt, and salmon. In the spring bowhead whales can also be seen in the gulf.

References

Location

External links
 Koryakia

Bodies of water of the Sea of Okhotsk
Gulfs of Russia
Bodies of water of Magadan Oblast
Bodies of water of Kamchatka Krai
Pacific Coast of Russia
Shipwrecks in the Sea of Okhotsk